Wakerley is a suburb in the City of Brisbane, Queensland, Australia.

Geography 

History 

Wakerley was named after early settler John William Wakerley.

Agnew School opened on 3 February 2003.

Agnew School opened in Agnew Street, Norman Park, on 3 February 2003. The school relocated to Wakerley in 2008 and, as at 2020, is known as the Brisbane campus of One School Global.

The median age of the Wakerley population was 33 years, 4 years below the Australian median. 68.7% of people living in Wakerley were born in Australia, compared to the national average of 69.8%; the next most common countries of birth were England 6.5%, New Zealand 6.3%, South Africa 4%, Scotland 1%, India 0.6%.  85.8% of people spoke only English at home; the next most common languages were 1.8% Afrikaans, 0.9% Greek, 0.7% Spanish, 0.6% Hindi, 0.6% Italian.

Education 
Agnew School is a private primary and secondary (3-12) school for boys and girls at 190 Ingleston Road. It is the Brisbane campus of One School Global, associated with the Plymouth Brethren Christian Church. In 2018, the school had an enrolment of 318 students with 36 teachers (32 full-time equivalent) and 26 non-teaching staff (20 full-time equivalent).

References

External links
 
 ourbrisbane.com website, Wakerley section

Suburbs of the City of Brisbane